On the Couch may refer to:

On the Couch, book by Lorraine Bracco
On the Couch (Irish TV series)
On the Couch (Australian TV series)
"On the Couch", a song by Supersuckers from La Mano Cornuda, 1994  
"On the Couch", a song by Prince from Musicology, 2004